Phalocallis is a genus of plants in the Iridaceae, first described as a genus in 1839. It contains only one recognized species, Phalocallis coelestis, native to Paraná State in southern Brazil, and also in northeastern Argentina.

References

Monotypic Iridaceae genera
Iridaceae
Flora of Brazil
Flora of Argentina